The three teams in this group played against each other on a home-and-away basis. The winner Argentina qualified for the eighth FIFA World Cup held in England.

Matches

 

 

 

 

 

Argentina qualified.

Final Table

Team stats

Head coach:  José María Minella

Head coach:  Freddy Valda

External links
FIFA official page
RSSSF - 1966 World Cup Qualification
Allworldcup

3
1965 in Argentine football
1965 in Bolivian sport
FIFA